Kvíabryggja Prison is a prison in Iceland, located in Snæfellsnes.

Kvíabryggja is an open prison and is not fenced off. It is used for prisoners who have less than 2 years remaining of their sentence, who are capable of serving a sentence with minimal supervision, and who do not have an addiction. Prisoners are expected to either work or receive education.

The prison was established in 1954 and has a capacity for 23 prisoners.

References

See also
 List of prisons in Iceland

Prisons in Iceland
1954 establishments in Iceland